Dalry railway station is a railway station serving the town of Dalry, North Ayrshire, Scotland. The station is managed by ScotRail and is on the Ayrshire Coast Line.

History 
The station was opened on 21 July 1840 by the Glasgow, Paisley, Kilmarnock and Ayr Railway. The station originally had two side platforms until the Dalry and North Johnstone Line was opened by the Glasgow and South Western Railway in 1905, when the station was remodeled with four platforms over two islands.

With the closure of both the Kilmarnock & North Johnstone lines to passenger traffic in 1966 and to all other traffic in 1973 (Kilmarnock line) & 1977 (North Johnstone Loop), having four lines through the station became superfluous, so the station platforms were remodelled during the line's electrification in the 1980s back to two side platforms.  The Ayrshire Coast Line was electrified by British Rail.

Services 

A typical service between Monday and Saturday is:
 Half-hourly service to 
 Hourly service to 
 Four trains per-hour to 

There are also occasional services to  Largs.  On Sundays, the Largs branch trains call hourly in each direction.

References

Notes

Sources 

 
 
 
 

Railway stations in North Ayrshire
Former Glasgow and South Western Railway stations
Railway stations in Great Britain opened in 1840
Railway stations served by ScotRail
SPT railway stations
Dalry, North Ayrshire